Jaime Nharimue Rodrigues (born 6 June 1955) is a Mozambican former sprinter. He competed in the 400 metres at the 1988 Summer Olympics and the 1992 Summer Olympics.

References

External links
 

1955 births
Living people
Athletes (track and field) at the 1988 Summer Olympics
Athletes (track and field) at the 1992 Summer Olympics
Mozambican male sprinters
Olympic athletes of Mozambique
Place of birth missing (living people)